This is a list of the National Register of Historic Places listings in Erath County, Texas.

This is intended to be a complete list of properties and districts listed on the National Register of Historic Places in Erath County, Texas. There are one district and five individual properties listed on the National Register in the county. Four properties are also Recorded Texas Historic Landmarks including one State Antiquities Landmark.

Current listings

The locations of National Register properties and districts may be seen in a mapping service provided.

|}

See also

National Register of Historic Places listings in Texas
Recorded Texas Historic Landmarks in Erath County

References

External links

Erath County, Texas
Erath County